Snub octahedron may refer to:

Icosahedron, with pyritohedral symmetry, 
Snub cube, or snub cuboctahedron,